is a Japanese anime television series produced by Sunrise's internal "Studio 7" division alongside Tokyu Agency. It is the eighth and final installment in Takara's Brave series franchise. It is directed by Yoshitomo Yonetani, with Yoshitake Suzuki handling series scripts, Takahiro Kimura designing the characters, Kunio Okawara designing the mechanical elements, Tomoaki Okada serving as art director and Kohei Tanaka producing the music. The series aired in Nagoya TV and TV Asahi affiliate stations from February 1, 1997, to January 31, 1998.

Plot
On a winter night, a mysterious mechanical lion came flying in front of a married couple, carrying a mysterious baby with it. As they took the baby in, the lion left them in confusion. About 7 years later, the space shuttle Spirits, in which high school astronaut Guy Shishioh is a passenger, collides with an unknown object bound to Earth. Despite being mortally wounded, he is rescued by the same mysterious lion and returns to Earth. In his hand, he holds a mysterious green jewel as Leo Shishioh uses it to revive Guy into a cyborg.

Two years later in 2005, the mysterious baby under the care of the Amami couple, now named Mamoru, is living his life normally. This until the mysterious group known as Zonders begin their invasion of Earth. As a response, the Earth Defense Brigade Gutsy Geoid Guard, or GGG, was organized to fight against the Zonders. In an attack by the Zonders, the mysterious boy encountered Guy, who is now a member of GGG. Equipped with the green jewel, known as G-Stone, he becomes the pilot of the lion robot that saved him. Named Galeon, he fuses with it alongside 3 assist vehicles created by GGG to become the giant robot GaoGaiGar. After the battle against one of the Zonders, GGG discovered that Mamoru can purify people who became Zonders and wondered about his origins and how it was linked to the appearance of the Zonders.

Development
The King of Braves GaoGaiGar was produced by Sunrise, with Takara promoting the toys for the series. Billed as the final installment of the Brave series, director Yoshitomo Yonetani originally named the series as "The King of Braves Gaggatti" as well as other proposed names such as "GargaiGaa" and ""GO Gieger" until the finalized name is accepted. The series' overall theme was based on the folktale The Tale of the Bamboo Cutter, reflecting on the strange origins of Mamoru Amami, the series' kid protagonist alongside the message of "If you have the courage, you can call in any miracle", woven into the series' narrative.

In order to differentiate it from the other Brave series, Real Robot terms and concepts alongside Super Robot concepts were woven into the narrative, in which is much more ambitious in execution. Throughout the whole story, the narrative is made similar to a hot-blooded manga, centering on the battle between a powerful extraterrestrial life form and a giant robot that brings together the best of human science, while incorporating detailed mechanic depictions each time throughout the series. The creation of such realistic-oriented mecha designs has also influenced the development of toys, and the gap between the depiction of the mechas in animation and the toys that were actually commercialized, which was remarkable than the previous series. In order to fill in the above, the series takes a stance in the animation production side and propose to toy makers more than ever. As a result, elements that have been regarded as "standard" in the Brave series, such as swords and guns as deadly weapons, power-ups in the form of "Super Combinations", have been eliminated in the series. In both the depiction in the series and the toys, the gimmicks and individuality of each mecha have become more fleshed out.

Media

Anime
The King of Braves GaoGaiGar aired on Nagoya TV from February 1, 1997, to January 31, 1998, consisting of 49 episodes. Masaaki Endoh performed the series' opening theme  while Satoko Shimonari performed the series' ending theme . Media Blasters once licensed the series on April 19, 2006, for North American territories in DVD format, with only 25 out of the 49 episodes dubbed in English. But due to multiple issues followed with poor sales, the series was dropped. The show was available as part of a digital subscription package from Daisuki until the service was terminated in 2017. Muse Communication later licensed the series alongside its sequel, with Muse Asia's YouTube Channel streaming the series in Southeast Asian territories on February 1, 2022. Discotek Media later rescued the license from Media Blasters and announced to release the series, alongside the OVA sequel, on Blu-ray in Winter 2023.

The show's popularity later resulted in the production of the eight–part sequel OVA The King of Braves GaoGaiGar Final, released from January 21, 2000, to March 21, 2003, and the spinpoff TV series Betterman, which aired in TV Tokyo from April 1, 1999, to September 30, 1999.

Episodes

Video games
The series received a video game spinoff titled  which was published by Takara and released for the PlayStation on April 8, 1999. The series also appeared in Takara's other video game series: 2000's Brave Saga 2 for the PlayStation, 2001's Brave Saga New Astaria for the Game Boy Color and 2005's New Century Brave Wars for the PlayStation 2. The series also made appearances in the Sunrise Eiyuutan series. GaoGaiGar has later appeared in the long running Super Robot Wars franchise, beginning with the 2nd Super Robot Wars Alpha.

Novel
A novel spinoff titled  was published by Media Factory on December 1, 2003, written by Yuichiro Takeda and illustrated by Takahiro Kimura and Seiichi Nakatani. The novel takes place after the events of the series and before the events of FINAL, focusing on Renais Kaldiff Shishioh, her origins and her fight against the criminal organization named BioNet.

See also

 The King of Braves GaoGaiGar Final
 Betterman

References

 "Brave Goukin GaoFighter" (November 2006). Newtype USA. p. 126.

External links
  
 
 The King of Braves GaoGaiGar pachinko game  

1997 anime television series debuts
Television series set in the future
Adventure anime and manga
Alien invasions in television
Brave series
MF Bunko J
Muse Communication
Sunrise (company)
Super robot anime and manga
Television series set in 2005
Television shows set in Tokyo
Video games about mecha
Super Robot Wars